Negaprion eurybathrodon is an extinct species of lemon shark, which existed globally from the Late Eocene to the Pliocene. It was described by Blake in 1862.

Distribution 
Fossils of Negaprion eurybathrodon have been found in:
Eocene
 Kithar Formation, Pakistan
 Jacksonian Formation, Georgia, United States

Miocene
 Punta Judas Formation, Costa Rica
 Bolognano Formation, Italy
 Blue Clay Formation and Globigerina Limestone, Malta
 Portugal
 Dam Formation, Saudi Arabia
 Cantaure Formation, Venezuela

Pliocene
 Onzole Formation, Ecuador

References 

†eurybathrodon
Miocene sharks
Eocene fish of Asia
Fossils of Pakistan
Prehistoric fish of Europe
Miocene animals of Europe
Fossils of Italy
Fossils of Malta
Fossils of Portugal
Eocene fish of North America
Fossils of Costa Rica
Fossils of the United States
Prehistoric fish of South America
Miocene animals of South America
Pliocene animals of South America
Neogene Ecuador
Fossils of Ecuador
Neogene Venezuela
Fossils of Venezuela
Fossil taxa described in 1862